N-Acetyllactosamine (LacNAc) (also known as CD75) is a nitrogen-containing disaccharide, a lactosamine derivative that is substituted with an acetyl group on its glucosamine component.

The N-acetyllactosamine is a component of many glycoproteins and functions as a carbohydrate antigen that is thought to play roles in normal cellular recognition as well as in malignant transformation and metastasis. It is also found in the structure of human milk oligosaccharides and has prebiotic effects.

References

External links 
 

Amino sugars
Disaccharides
Acetamides